Sue Foley (born March 29, 1968) is a Canadian blues guitarist and singer. She has released 15 albums since her debut with Young Girl Blues (1992). In May 2020, Foley won her first Blues Music Award, in the 'Koko Taylor Award (Traditional Blues Female)' category.

Early life
Foley was born in Ottawa, Ontario, and spent her early childhood in Canada. She learned to play guitar at age 13, became interested in blues music from listening to the Rolling Stones, and played her first gig at age 16. After high school graduation, she relocated to Vancouver where she formed The Sue Foley Band and toured Canada. In 1988–1989, the Sue Foley Band teamed with Mark Hummel to tour across the United States, Canada and Europe as well as recording an album. The collaboration lasted a little over a year with 300 dates on the road in 1989. Clifford Antone saw Foley sitting in with Duke Robillard while the band was in Memphis for the W.C. Handy Awards that year.

Career
By age twenty-one, Foley was living in Austin, Texas, United States, and recording for Antone's, the blues label and historic nightclub. Her first release was Young Girl Blues.

Foley has toured steadily with her band, toting her signature pink paisley Fender Telecaster. In 2001, she won the Juno Award for her CD, Love Coming Down. Foley has also earned seventeen Maple Blues Awards and three Trophees de Blues de France. She has also garnered several nominations at the Blues Music Awards in Memphis, Tennessee.

2018 marked Foley's return as a solo artist with her album, The Ice Queen, which featured guest appearances by Billy Gibbons of ZZ Top and Jimmie Vaughan.

In May 2020, Foley won a Blues Music Award in the 'Koko Taylor Award (Traditional Blues Female)' category.

Discography

As leader/co-leader
1992: Young Girl Blues (Antone's)
1993: Without a Warning (Antone's)
1995: Big City Blues (Antone's)
1996: Walk in the Sun (Antone's)
1998: Ten Days in November (Shanachie)
2000: Love Comin' Down (Shanachie)
2000: Back to the Blues [also released as Secret Weapon] (Antone's)
2002: Where the Action Is... (Shanachie)
2004: Change (Ruf)
2006: New Used Car (Ruf)
2007: Time Bomb (with Deborah Coleman, Roxanne Potvin) (Ruf)
2009: Queen Bee: The Antone's Collection (Floating World) compilation
2010: He Said She Said (with Peter Karp) (Blind Pig)
2012: Beyond the Crossroads (with Peter Karp) (Blind Pig)
2018: The Ice Queen (Stony Plain 1398; Dixiefrog 8803)
2021: Pinky's Blues (Stony Plain 1430)

As primary artist on other albums
 1991: Various Artists – KLBJ FM's Local Licks Live 1990 (KLBJ) – track 15, "Walking Home"
 1994: Various Artists – Brace Yourself! A Tribute To Otis Blackwell (Shanachie) – track 11, "Great Balls Of Fire" with Joe Ely
 1995: Various Artists – Bluesiana Hurricane (Shanachie) featuring R&B Legends: Rufus Thomas, Bill Doggett, Jazz Legends: Lester Bowie, Bobby Watson, Rock Legends: Chuck Rainey, Will Calhoun
 2000: Various Artists – Public Domain (Purchase) – track 3, "Going Away Blues"
 2000: Various Artists – Dealin' With the Devil: Songs of Robert Johnson (Cannonball) – track 7, "From Four Until Late"
 2002: The Blues: From Yesterday's Masters To Today's Cutting Edge (American Roots Songbook Series), (Shanachie, as licensed to St. Clair Entertainment)
 2002: Various Artists – Preachin' the Blues: The Music of Mississippi Fred McDowell (Telarc) – track 8, "Frisco Line"
 2003: Various Artists – Blues On Blonde On Blonde (Telarc) – track 2, "Most Likely You'll Go Your Way And I'll Go Mine"
 2006: Saturday Night Blues: 20 Years, (CBC/Universal Music Group)

As guest musician on other albums
 1989: Mark Hummel – Up and Jumpin with the Sue Foley Band and guest: Charles Brown, (Rockinitus Records)
 1994: Mark Hummel – Feel Like Rockin''' (Flying Fish / Rounder)
 1995: Wayne Hancock – Thunderstorms and Neon Signs (Dejadisc)
 1998: Lazy Lester – All Over You (Antone's)
 2001: Lazy Lester – Blues Stop Knockin (Antone's)
 2003: Big Dave McLean – Blues from the Middle (Stony Plain)
 2004: Blackie and the Rodeo Kings – Bark (True North)
 2007: Candye Kane – Guitar'd and Feathered (Ruf Records)
 2007: Michael Jerome Browne – Double (Borealis)
 2007: Southside Steve Marriner – Going Up (Dog My Cat)
 2013: Lee Holmes – Sit Down Blues (Itsa Music Co.)

Filmography
2005: Sue Foley - Live in Europe (Ruf) DVD
2010: Sue Foley - Guitar Woman'' (Alfred's Artist Series/Instructional) DVD

References

External links
 
 
2006 Interview on Modern Guitars Magazine

1968 births
Living people
Canadian blues singers
Canadian blues guitarists
Canadian women guitarists
Electric blues musicians
Juno Award for Blues Album of the Year winners
Musicians from Ottawa
Contemporary blues musicians
Shanachie Records artists
New West Records artists
Ruf Records artists
20th-century Canadian women singers
21st-century Canadian women singers
Blind Pig Records artists